Michail Asterios Sapkas was a Greek revolutionary of the Macedonian Struggle and politician.

Biography 
Sapkas was born in 1873 in Magarevo, then Ottoman Empire (now North Macedonia). He studied medicine in the University of Athens. Some years before the Macedonian Struggle occurred, he with his family moved to Larissa, where he joined the "New Filiki Eteria" (Νέα Φιλική Εταιρεία) which was established by Anastasios Pichion. He established the Macedonian Society of Larissa, which during the Macedonian Struggle was recruiting volunteers from the nearby areas.

He was elected mayor of Larissa 4 times (1914, 1925, 1929, 1934), and during his service the local water supply and electricity systems got upgraded, as well as the first sidewalks were formed, modern courts of justice were created and the Municipal Conservatory, the Municipal Library and also the Museum of Larissa were founded. Also, during his days, the Senior Gendarmerie Administration of Thessaly was established in Larissa and he granted 15 stremma for the erection of the Alcazar Stadium in 1932. Furthermore, he was elected Member of the Greek Parliament representing Larissa in 1920 and 1936, supporting the People's Party.

He died in 1956, at the age of 83.

References 

19th-century births
1956 deaths
People from Bitola Municipality
People's Party (Greece) politicians
Greek people of the Macedonian Struggle
Greek Macedonians
National and Kapodistrian University of Athens alumni
MPs of Larissa
Expatriates from the Ottoman Empire in Greece